Fred Henry McGuire (November 7, 1890 – February 4, 1958) was a Hospital Apprentice in the United States Navy and a Medal of Honor recipient for his role in the Philippine–American War.

He died February 4, 1958, and is buried in Springfield National Cemetery, Springfield, Missouri. His grave can be found in section 29, grave 332.

Medal of Honor citation
Rank and organization: Hospital Apprentice, U.S. Navy. Born: 7 November 1890, Gordonville, Missouri Entered service at: Gordonville, Mo. G.O. No.: 138, 13 December 1911.

Citation:

While attached to the U.S.S. Pampang, McGuire was one of a shore party moving in to capture Mundang, on the island of Basilan, Philippine Islands, on the morning of 24 September 1911. Ordered to take station within 100 yards of a group of nipa huts close to the trail, McGuire advanced and stood guard as the leader and his scout party first searched the surrounding deep grasses, then moved into the open area before the huts. Instantly enemy Moros opened point-blank fire on the exposed men and approximately 20 Moros charged the small group from inside the huts and from other concealed positions. McGuire, responding to the calls for help, was one of the first on the scene. After emptying his rifle into the attackers, he closed in with rifle, using it as a club to wage fierce battle until his comrades arrived on the field, when he rallied to the aid of his dying leader and other wounded. Although himself wounded, McGuire ministered tirelessly and efficiently to those who had been struck down, thereby saving the lives of 2 who otherwise might have succumbed to enemy-inflicted wounds.

See also

List of Medal of Honor recipients
List of Philippine–American War Medal of Honor recipients

References

United States Navy Medal of Honor recipients
United States Navy sailors
People from Cape Girardeau County, Missouri
American military personnel of the Philippine–American War
1890 births
1958 deaths
Philippine–American War recipients of the Medal of Honor
Military personnel from Missouri
Burials at Springfield National Cemetery